San Fernando de la Buena Vista is a city in the Gran Buenos Aires area, in Argentina, and capital of the San Fernando Partido,  north of the city of Buenos Aires.

Geographic Data
It is the nautical capital of Argentina.

The city is bordered by San Isidro and Tigre. Its continental area is composed of the towns of Virreyes, San Fernando and Victoria. The rest of his jurisdiction comprises the second and third sections of the Paraná Delta Islands.

Surface area 
 Continental section: 
 Delta section:  (approx.)

Distances 
 28 km from the City of Buenos Aires.
 95 km from the City of La Plata.

Population 
 Total population: 151,131
 Urban population: 147,409
 Rural population (delta): 3,058

Population by localities 
 San Fernando: 68,806
 Victoria: 40,461
 Virreyes: 38,142
 Delta: 3,058

Education

Buenos Aires International Christian Academy, an English-only Christian International school in Argentina, is located in San Fernando.

References

External links

 Municipal website
 local news webpage

Populated places in Buenos Aires Province
San Fernando de la Buena Vista
Cities in Argentina
Argentina